Kwara Football Academy (KFA), an initiative within western Nigeria for the Kwara State by Governor, Dr. Bukola Saraki. It was opened by the President of the Confederation of African Football (CAF) Issa Hayatou in 2005.  The Academy's focus is on skill development. It is open to all regardless of place of origin. The Academy currently has seven coaches who are all former international football players with coaching certificates.

Objectives

The Kwara Football Association was a private initiative that was brought to life with the support of the state government. It was established as a center for youth development, using football as the medium of empowerment. The Academy provides a conducive and unique surrounding to keep youths away from drugs, violence and other unhealthy activities. 
With 81 students currently, KFA is aimed at training footballers between the ages of 13 and 21 years to compete favourably with their counterparts at international levels. It is also focused on developing the skills of the footballers such that after graduation, they can pursue careers as professional footballers with international football clubs.
Kwara Football Academy is the first of its kind in Nigeria: it provides opportunities for potential footballers to receive a first class education whilst honing their football skills.  The football academy sets the stage for Kwara State to become the ultimate center for the future development of football in Nigeria.

Overview
KFA offers talented youths the opportunity to acquire a formal education for free while training as professional footballers. The Academy offers a full on campus boarding experience to ensure student concentration and full engagement while in school. The curriculum is modelled after the Nigerian educational system and some aspects of the British curriculum, allowing the students to be able to write exams such as the West African School Certificate Examinations, (WASC), National Examination Certificate (NECO), International General Certificate of Secondary Education (IGCSE), Test of English as a Foreign Language (TOEFL) and the International Baccalaureate (IB). 
As part of the academic training, students are exposed to languages, including English and other Modern European Languages, General and Applied Mathematics, Humanities and Social Sciences, Creative, Technical and Vocational studies and Natural Sciences as areas of study.
The students are grouped into three categories; The junior cadre comprise student between ages 13–14, the intermediate cadre comprise students between ages 15–16 while the elite cadre comprise student between ages 17–19.

While the Junior and Intermediate group combine academics with football, the elite group combines football with management courses.

The Facility

The academy is situated on about 35 hectares of land within the Kwara State Stadium Complex in Ilorin. The existing facilities have the capacity to accommodate 200 students. Some of the existing structures include: four standard football pitches well grassed with submersible sprinklers, one tennis court, one basketball court, one gymnasium, three blocks of students hostels (27 rooms each) and a medical center.

Achievements
Players of KFA have participated in try-outs with several international clubs. In 2009, two of the players were invited for trials with Chelsea Football Club England and two also for trials at Portsmouth Football Club in England. Some products of the Academy are currently playing in different clubs within and outside Nigeria. Some of these include Ahmed Abdul-Taofik who is playing for FK Ventspils of Latvia Premier league, four players at the Kwara United and four players for Bukola Babes Football Club. In 2009, three of the students from KFA were in the Nigerian U-17 team, which won silver at that year's U-17 World Cup.

References

External links
Official website

Kwara State
Football in Nigeria
Football academies in Africa